Events in the year 1986 in Mexico.

Incumbents

Federal government
 President: Miguel de la Madrid
 Interior Secretary (SEGOB): Manuel Bartlett Díaz
 Secretary of Foreign Affairs (SRE): Bernardo Sepúlveda Amor
 Communications Secretary (SCT): Daniel Díaz Díaz
 Education Secretary (SEP): Manuel Bartlett
 Secretary of Defense (SEDENA): Juan Arévalo Gardoqui
 Secretary of Navy: Miguel Ángel Gómez Ortega
 Secretary of Labor and Social Welfare: Arsenio Farell Cubillas
 Secretary of Welfare: Guillermo Carrillo Arena/Manuel Camacho Solís
 Secretary of Public Education: Miguel González Avelar
 Tourism Secretary (SECTUR): Carlos Hank González 
 Secretary of the Environment (SEMARNAT): Pedro Ojeda Paullada
 Secretary of Health (SALUD): Guillermo Soberón Acevedo

Supreme Court

 President of the Supreme Court: Carlos del Río Rodríguez

Governors

 Aguascalientes: Rodolfo Landeros Gallegos/José Refugio Esparza Reyes
 Baja California: Xicoténcatl Leyva Mortera (PRI)
 Baja California Sur: Alberto Andrés Alvarado Arámburo
 Campeche: Abelardo Carrillo Zavala
 Chiapas: Gustavo Armendáriz/Absalón Castellanos Domínguez
 Chihuahua: Oscar Ornelas/Saúl González Herrera/Fernando Baeza Meléndez
 Coahuila: José de las Fuentes Rodríguez
 Colima: Elías Zamora Verduzco
 Durango: José Ramírez Gamero 
 Guanajuato: Rafael Corrales Ayala
 Guerrero: Alejandro Cervantes Delgado
 Hidalgo: Guillermo Rossell de la Lama
 Jalisco: Enrique Álvarez del Castillo
 State of Mexico: Alfredo del Mazo González
 Michoacán: Cuauhtémoc Cárdenas/Luis Martínez Villicaña
 Morelos: Lauro Ortega Martínez (PRI).
 Nayarit: Emilio Manuel González Parra
 Nuevo León: Jorge Treviño
 Oaxaca: Heladio Ramírez López
 Puebla: Guillermo Jiménez Morales
 Querétaro: Mariano Palacios Alcocer
 Quintana Roo: Pedro Joaquín Coldwell
 San Luis Potosí: Florencio Salazar Martínez
 Sinaloa: Francisco Labastida
 Sonora: Rodolfo Félix Valdés 
 Tabasco: Enrique González Pedrero
 Tamaulipas: Américo Villarreal Guerra	
 Tlaxcala: Tulio Hernández Gómez
 Veracruz: Agustín Acosta Lagunes/Fernando Gutiérrez Barrios
 Yucatán: Víctor Manzanilla Schaffer
 Zacatecas: José Guadalupe Cervantes Corona/Genaro Borrego Estrada
Regent of Mexico City: Ramón Aguirre Velázquez

Events
 The girl band Fandango is established. 
 The Museo de la Estampa and the Franz Mayer Museum are founded. 
 The Colegio Nautilus is established.  
 Vacation resort Rancho Leonero is established.
 Conni Carranza from Sonora becomes Señorita México 1986.
 The Xochimilco Light Rail starts operating after being upgraded from a streetcar line.
 March 31: Mexicana Flight 940 
 September 11: Centro Escolar el Encino established.

Awards
Belisario Domínguez Medal of Honor – Salvador Zubirán

Film
 
 List of Mexican films of 1986

Sport

 1985–86 Mexican Primera División season 
 Ángeles Negros de Puebla win the Mexican League
 1986 FIFA World Cup
 1986 Central American and Caribbean Junior Championships in Athletics in Mexico City.
 1986 Mexican Grand Prix

Births
July 8: Jaime Garcia, baseball player
November 22: Sebastián Zurita, actor.
Date unknown: Luis Trujillo Llame, Catholic priest; (d. November 21, 2018).

Deaths

 July 9: Nellie Campobello, writer. (b. 1900)
August 6: Emilio Fernández, movie director, actor, and screenwriter (b. 1904)

References

External links

 
Mexico